This is a list of protected areas of Cambodia.

A total of 8 forms of protected area are recognized under the Cambodian Protected Area Law of 2008. These are:

 	National Park 
 	Wildlife sanctuary 
 	Protected landscape 
 	Multiple use area 
 	Ramsar site 
 	Biosphere reserve 
 	Natural heritage site 
 	Marine park

National Parks

Botum Sakor National Park
Central Cardamom Mountains National Park
Hun Sen Russei Trep National Park
Kep National Park
Kirirom National Park
Koh Rong National Park
O'Yadav National Park
Phnom Kulen National Park
Preah Monivong National Park
Ream National Park
Southern Cardamom National Park
Veun Sai-Siem Pang National Park
Virachey National Park

Wildlife sanctuaries 

Beng Per Wildlife Sanctuary
Chhaeb Wildlife Sanctuary
Keo Seima Wildlife Sanctuary
Kulen Promtep Wildlife Sanctuary
Lomphat Wildlife Sanctuary
Peam Krasop Wildlife Sanctuary
Phnom Aural Wildlife Sanctuary
Phnom Nam Lyr Wildlife Sanctuary
Phnom Prich Wildlife Sanctuary
Phnom Sankos Wildlife Sanctuary
Phnom Thnout-Phnom Pok Wildlife Sanctuary
Preah Roka Wildlife Sanctuary
Prek Prasab Wildlife Sanctuary
Prey Lang Wildlife Sanctuary
Roneam Daun Sam Wildlife Sanctuary
Sambor Wildlife Sanctuary
Sanka Rokhavan Wildlife Sanctuary
Siem Pang Wildlife Sanctuary
Snoul Wildlife Sanctuary
Sre Pok Wildlife Sanctuary
Stung Sen Wildlife Sanctuary
Tatai Wildlife Sanctuary

Protected Landscapes 

An Long Pring Protected Landscape
Ang Trapeng Thmor Protected Landscape
Angkor Protected Landscape
Banteay Chhmar Protected Landscape
Boeng Lomkod Protected Landscape
Boeng Prektub Protected Landscape
Boeung Prek Lpov Protected Landscape
Kulen Elephant Forest
North Tonle Sap Protected Landscape
Phnom Krang Dey Meas Protected Landscape
Prasat Bakan (Kampong Svay) Protected Landscape
Preah Vihear Protected Landscape
Roneam Daun Sam Protected Landscape
Sambor Prey Kok Temple Protected Landscape
Yak Oum-Yakara Protected Landscape

Multiple Use Areas 

Boeng Chhmar Multiple Use Area
Boeng Yeak Laom Multiple Use Area
Dong Peng Multiple Use Area
Kbal Chay Multiple Use Area
Phnom Neang Kong Rey Multiple Use Area
Prek Toal Multiple Use Area
Punchearkrek Multiple Use Area
Samlaut Multiple Use Area
Sorsor Sdam Sat Tor Multiple Use Area
Stung Sen Multiple Use Area
Tonle Sap Multiple Use Area

Natural Heritage Sites 

Phnom Tbeng Natural Heritage Park
Phnom Yat Natural Heritage Park
Phnom Pram Pi Natural Heritage Park
Phnom Kiriyung Natural Heritage Park
Phnom Taik Traing Natural Heritage Park
Phnom Bak Natural Heritage Park
Phnom Chhnang Natural Heritage Park
Phnom Preah Net Preah Natural Heritage Park
Phnom Preah-Phnom Veng Natural Heritage Park
Phnom Yeay Sam Natural Heritage Park
Phnom Svay Natural Heritage Park

Other protected areas

Boeng Tonle Chhmar
Tonlé Sap Biosphere Reserve
Stung Treng Ramsar
Koh Kae Protected Resort

Degazetted protected areas 
Snoul Wildlife Sanctuary

See also 
 List of World Heritage Sites in Cambodia

References

External links
 Protected Areas and Development in The Lower Mekong River Region, International Centre for Environmental Management. Overview of Parks, Reserves, and Other Protected Areas in Cambodia.
 World Database on Protected Areas
 Protected areas system in Cambodia

 
Cambodia
Cambodia
Camb
Protected areas